Minnesota State Highway 286 (MN 286) is a  highway in north-central Minnesota, which runs from its intersection with State Highway 6 in Talmoon and continues east to its eastern terminus at its intersection with State Highway 38 in Marcell.

Route description
Highway 286 serves as a short east–west connector route in north-central Minnesota between the unincorporated communities of Talmoon and Marcell.  The route connects State Highways 6 and 38. It is located within the Chippewa National Forest.

The roadway passes around the south side of Little Turtle Lake at Talmoon.

The route is legally defined as Route 286 in the Minnesota Statutes.

History
Highway 286 was authorized on July 1, 1949.

The route was paved at the time it was marked.

Major intersections

References

External links

Highway 286 at the Unofficial Minnesota Highways Page

286
Transportation in Itasca County, Minnesota